The 7th Military Base is a sizable overseas military base of the Russian Armed Forces stationed in Bombora in the partially recognized Republic of Abkhazia. The base is subordinate to the command of the 49th Combined Arms Army and the Southern Military District of the Russian Armed Forces.

History

The base originated from the 131st Separate Motor Rifle Brigade, which was a unit of the Soviet Army and of the Russian Ground Forces. Following the Russo-Georgian War of 2008, it was decided that a permanent Russian military base was needed. On 1 February 2009, the brigade was reorganized and the 7th Krasnodar Red Banner Order of Kutuzov and Red Star Military Base was established. On 17 February, Russian President Dmitry Medvedev and Abkhazian leader Sergey Bagapsh signed an agreement on a unified Russian military base on the territory of Abkhazia.

In accordance with the Russian-Abkhaz agreement, the united military base included former peacekeeping facilities" the Bamboura Airport located in the Gudauta area, a military training ground and part of the sea bay near Ochamchire, joint Russian-Abkhaz military garrisons deployed in the Kodori Valley and near the Enguri Dam. In addition, military-administrative and medical facilities (sanatoriums and rest homes) for the base were to be located in Sukhumi, Gagra, Gudauta, New Athos, Eshera and other settlements of in the region. The period of operation of the base is 49 years, with the possibility of automatic renewal for subsequent 15-year periods. For combat training, the military training grounds in Gudauta as well as Molkin in the Krasnodar Territory are utilized. In 2015, preparatory work began on the construction and arrangement of social and military infrastructure facilities at the military base. Since 2016, the tank and motorized rifle units of the base have utilized the honorary title of "percussion".

100th anniversary

In July 2018, the unit celebrated the centennial of its lineage. The anniversary celebrations were attended by the leadership of the Southern Military District, the 49th Combined Arms Army, and the leadership Abkhazian Armed Forces. In the case of the latter, President Raul Khajimba was in attendance. At the invitation of Colonel Commander Igor Egorov, veterans of the unit arrived from Maykop, Krasnodar and other cities. The commander was awarded the highest award of the state; "Glory of Adygea".

2022 Russian invasion of Ukraine 
In March 2022, elements of the 7th Military Base were redeployed to join the Russian invasion of Ukraine. According to the General Staff of the Ukrainian Armed Forces, they were organized into two battalion tactical groups, with a total number of 800 servicemen. On 31 March 2022, the Ukrainian military reported it had inflicted losses on the troops of the 7th Military Base at an unidentified location on the Eastern front.

Commanders
Colonel Sergey Chebotaryov (2007–2009)
Major General Yakov Rezantsev  (2011–2013)
Major General Mikhail Kosobokov (2015–2017)
Colonel Igor Yegorov (2017–2019)
Colonel Oleg Senkov (2019–Present)

Composition

 526th Separate Motor Rifle Battalion (Military Unit No.03768)
 527th Separate Motor Rifle Battalion (Military Unit No.03769)
 529th Separate Motor Rifle Battalion (Military Unit No.03841)
 558th Separate Motor Rifle Battalion (Military Unit No.03833)
 9th Separate Tank Battalion (Military Unit No.03842)
 S-400 and S-300 surface-to-air missile elements reported
 Other lighter support units

See also
List of Russian military bases abroad
Operational Group of Russian Forces
4th Guards Military Base

References

Army units and formations of Russia
Military installations of Russia in other countries
Military units and formations established in 2009
Military of Abkhazia